Thomas Craig Brown (born 1938) is an American-Canadian mathematician, Ramsey Theorist, and Professor Emeritus at Simon Fraser University.

Collaborations 
As a mathematician, Brown’s primary focus in his research is in the field of Ramsey Theory. When completing his Ph.D., his thesis was 'On Semigroups which are Unions of Periodic Groups' In 1963 as a graduate student, he showed that if the positive integers are finitely colored, then some color class is piece-wise syndetic.

In Descriptions of the characteristic sequence of an irrational, Brown discusses the following idea: Let  be a positive irrational real number.

He has collaborated with Paul Erdős, including Quasi-Progressions and Descending Waves and Quantitative Forms of a Theorem of Hilbert.

References

External links 
 Archive of papers published by Tom Brown
 2003 INTEGERS conference dedicated to Tom Brown

20th-century  American  mathematicians
21st-century  American mathematicians
21st-century Canadian mathematicians
1938 births
Living people
Reed College alumni
Washington University in St. Louis alumni
Washington University in St. Louis mathematicians
American people of Canadian descent
Academic staff of Simon Fraser University
Scientists from Portland, Oregon